Bassaniana decorata is a species of spiders in the genus Bassaniana, found in Russia, China, Korea and Japan.

References

Spiders of Asia
Spiders of Russia
Thomisidae
Spiders described in 1879